Grete Stückgold (6 July 1895, in London – 15 September 1977, in Falls Village, Connecticut) was a British-American operatic soprano.

She married .

Her debut at the Metropolitan Opera was on November 2, 1927 the role of Eva in Die Meistersinger von Nürnberg. In 1929 she created the lead in Paul Hindemith's opera Neues vom Tage.

References

External links
List of performances at the Metropolitan Opera

1895 births
1977 deaths
American operatic sopranos
Singers from London
English operatic sopranos
People from Canaan, Connecticut
20th-century British women opera singers
20th-century American women opera singers